The Kirov-Chepetsk constituency (No.106) is a Russian legislative constituency in Kirov Oblast. The constituency covers parts of Kirov and southern Kirov Oblast.

Members elected

Election results

1993

|-
! colspan=2 style="background-color:#E9E9E9;text-align:left;vertical-align:top;" |Candidate
! style="background-color:#E9E9E9;text-align:left;vertical-align:top;" |Party
! style="background-color:#E9E9E9;text-align:right;" |Votes
! style="background-color:#E9E9E9;text-align:right;" |%
|-
|style="background-color:"|
|align=left|Yegor Agafonov
|align=left|Independent
|
|31.95%
|-
|style="background-color:"|
|align=left|Pyotr Polyantsev
|align=left|Independent
| -
|22.90%
|-
| colspan="5" style="background-color:#E9E9E9;"|
|- style="font-weight:bold"
| colspan="3" style="text-align:left;" | Total
| 
| 100%
|-
| colspan="5" style="background-color:#E9E9E9;"|
|- style="font-weight:bold"
| colspan="4" |Source:
|
|}

1995

|-
! colspan=2 style="background-color:#E9E9E9;text-align:left;vertical-align:top;" |Candidate
! style="background-color:#E9E9E9;text-align:left;vertical-align:top;" |Party
! style="background-color:#E9E9E9;text-align:right;" |Votes
! style="background-color:#E9E9E9;text-align:right;" |%
|-
|style="background-color:"|
|align=left|Aleksey Melkov
|align=left|Agrarian Party
|
|29.75%
|-
|style="background-color:"|
|align=left|Valery Lekomtsev
|align=left|Independent
|
|17.25%
|-
|style="background-color:#D50000"|
|align=left|Tamara Urvantseva
|align=left|Communists and Working Russia - for the Soviet Union
|
|16.00%
|-
|style="background-color:"|
|align=left|Marat Salikhov
|align=left|Liberal Democratic Party
|
|11.61%
|-
|style="background-color:#2C299A"|
|align=left|Samvel Kochoi
|align=left|Congress of Russian Communities
|
|6.66%
|-
|style="background-color:"|
|align=left|Vyacheslav Torsunov
|align=left|Independent
|
|4.90%
|-
|style="background-color:#016436"|
|align=left|Minegayaz Faskhutdinov
|align=left|Nur
|
|1.78%
|-
|style="background-color:#000000"|
|colspan=2 |against all
|
|10.44%
|-
| colspan="5" style="background-color:#E9E9E9;"|
|- style="font-weight:bold"
| colspan="3" style="text-align:left;" | Total
| 
| 100%
|-
| colspan="5" style="background-color:#E9E9E9;"|
|- style="font-weight:bold"
| colspan="4" |Source:
|
|}

1999

|-
! colspan=2 style="background-color:#E9E9E9;text-align:left;vertical-align:top;" |Candidate
! style="background-color:#E9E9E9;text-align:left;vertical-align:top;" |Party
! style="background-color:#E9E9E9;text-align:right;" |Votes
! style="background-color:#E9E9E9;text-align:right;" |%
|-
|style="background-color:"|
|align=left|Nikolay Kiselyov
|align=left|Independent
|
|33.93%
|-
|style="background-color:#FF4400"|
|align=left|Vladimir Vlasov
|align=left|Andrey Nikolayev and Svyatoslav Fyodorov Bloc
|
|10.19%
|-
|style="background-color:"|
|align=left|Valentin Pervakov
|align=left|Independent
|
|9.43%
|-
|style="background-color:"|
|align=left|Valentina Zykina
|align=left|Our Home – Russia
|
|8.74%
|-
|style="background-color:#C62B55"|
|align=left|Sergey Yakshin
|align=left|Peace, Labour, May
|
|8.32%
|-
|style="background-color:#3B9EDF"|
|align=left|Olga Chezhegova
|align=left|Fatherland – All Russia
|
|6.10%
|-
|style="background-color:"|
|align=left|Leonid Simonov
|align=left|Yabloko
|
|5.58%
|-
|style="background-color:"|
|align=left|Sergey Sharenkov
|align=left|Independent
|
|2.05%
|-
|style="background-color:"|
|align=left|Aleksey Pogrebnoy
|align=left|Kedr
|
|1.65%
|-
|style="background-color:#084284"|
|align=left|Boris Basmanov
|align=left|Spiritual Heritage
|
|0.75%
|-
|style="background-color:#000000"|
|colspan=2 |against all
|
|11.65%
|-
| colspan="5" style="background-color:#E9E9E9;"|
|- style="font-weight:bold"
| colspan="3" style="text-align:left;" | Total
| 
| 100%
|-
| colspan="5" style="background-color:#E9E9E9;"|
|- style="font-weight:bold"
| colspan="4" |Source:
|
|}

2003

|-
! colspan=2 style="background-color:#E9E9E9;text-align:left;vertical-align:top;" |Candidate
! style="background-color:#E9E9E9;text-align:left;vertical-align:top;" |Party
! style="background-color:#E9E9E9;text-align:right;" |Votes
! style="background-color:#E9E9E9;text-align:right;" |%
|-
|style="background-color:"|
|align=left|Vladimir Klimov
|align=left|United Russia
|
|33.81%
|-
|style="background-color:"|
|align=left|Nikolay Kiselyov (incumbent)
|align=left|Communist Party
|
|28.38%
|-
|style="background:#1042A5"| 
|align=left|Andrey Vavilov
|align=left|Union of Right Forces
|
|7.10%
|-
|style="background-color:"|
|align=left|Vasily Vershinin
|align=left|Agrarian Party
|
|7.07%
|-
|style="background-color:"|
|align=left|Vladimir Ponomarev
|align=left|Liberal Democratic Party
|
|3.68%
|-
|style="background-color:"|
|align=left|Dmitry Shvetsov
|align=left|Yabloko
|
|3.62%
|-
|style="background-color:#000000"|
|colspan=2 |against all
|
|12.29%
|-
| colspan="5" style="background-color:#E9E9E9;"|
|- style="font-weight:bold"
| colspan="3" style="text-align:left;" | Total
| 
| 100%
|-
| colspan="5" style="background-color:#E9E9E9;"|
|- style="font-weight:bold"
| colspan="4" |Source:
|
|}

2016

|-
! colspan=2 style="background-color:#E9E9E9;text-align:left;vertical-align:top;" |Candidate
! style="background-color:#E9E9E9;text-align:left;vertical-align:top;" |Party
! style="background-color:#E9E9E9;text-align:right;" |Votes
! style="background-color:#E9E9E9;text-align:right;" |%
|-
|style="background-color: " |
|align=left|Oleg Valenchuk
|align=left|United Russia
|
|40.44%
|-
|style="background-color:"|
|align=left|Sergey Doronin
|align=left|A Just Russia
|
|19.08%
|-
|style="background-color:"|
|align=left|Sergey Mamayev
|align=left|Communist Party
|
|12.93%
|-
|style="background-color:"|
|align=left|Vladimir Kostin
|align=left|Liberal Democratic Party
|
|12.14%
|-
|style="background-color:"|
|align=left|Olga Shakleina
|align=left|The Greens
|
|3.58%
|-
|style="background:"| 
|align=left|Oleg Kassin
|align=left|Party of Growth
|
|2.07%
|-
|style="background:"| 
|align=left|Vladimir Porchesku
|align=left|Communists of Russia
|
|1.98%
|-
|style="background:"| 
|align=left|Artur Abashev
|align=left|Yabloko
|
|1.94%
|-
|style="background-color: "|
|align=left|Fyodor Luginin
|align=left|Rodina
|
|1.32%
|-
| colspan="5" style="background-color:#E9E9E9;"|
|- style="font-weight:bold"
| colspan="3" style="text-align:left;" | Total
| 
| 100%
|-
| colspan="5" style="background-color:#E9E9E9;"|
|- style="font-weight:bold"
| colspan="4" |Source:
|
|}

2021

|-
! colspan=2 style="background-color:#E9E9E9;text-align:left;vertical-align:top;" |Candidate
! style="background-color:#E9E9E9;text-align:left;vertical-align:top;" |Party
! style="background-color:#E9E9E9;text-align:right;" |Votes
! style="background-color:#E9E9E9;text-align:right;" |%
|-
|style="background-color: " |
|align=left|Oleg Valenchuk (incumbent)
|align=left|United Russia
|
|31.20%
|-
|style="background-color:"|
|align=left|Nadezhda Surayeva
|align=left|A Just Russia — For Truth
|
|24.36%
|-
|style="background-color:"|
|align=left|Sergey Mamayev
|align=left|Communist Party
|
|15.46%
|-
|style="background-color:"|
|align=left|Vladimir Kostin
|align=left|Liberal Democratic Party
|
|7.53%
|-
|style="background-color: " |
|align=left|Anastasia Skurikhina
|align=left|New People
|
|7.47%
|-
|style="background-color: "|
|align=left|Aleksandr Markov
|align=left|Party of Pensioners
|
|4.69%
|-
|style="background:"| 
|align=left|Sergey Sadovnikov
|align=left|Communists of Russia
|
|3.23%
|-
|style="background-color: "|
|align=left|Olga Sykchina
|align=left|Rodina
|
|1.63%
|-
| colspan="5" style="background-color:#E9E9E9;"|
|- style="font-weight:bold"
| colspan="3" style="text-align:left;" | Total
| 
| 100%
|-
| colspan="5" style="background-color:#E9E9E9;"|
|- style="font-weight:bold"
| colspan="4" |Source:
|
|}

Notes

References

Russian legislative constituencies
Politics of Kirov Oblast